Redmond O'Toole is an Irish classical guitarist who performs on a Brahms guitar. His former teachers include Oscar Ghiglia, Paul Galbraith, Graham Devine and John Feeley. He studied at the Dublin Institute of Technology and the  Accademia Musicale Chigiana in Siena.

O'Toole performs as a soloist or with orchestra. He was a founder member of the Dublin Guitar Quartet and has worked with musicians such as Cora Venus Lunny and Elizabeth Cooney. He has also toured Europe with traditional Irish group The Chieftains.

Discography 

Baroque - 2008, Bornheim Klassik (BKCD6878)
Movements - 2006, Bornheim Klassik (BKCD6877)
Deleted Pieces (Dublin Guitar Quartet) - 2006, Greyslate Records

Sources 
http://www.classicallinks.ie/profile.asp?ID=30
http://www.rte.ie/tv/theview/archive/20070116.html
http://www.rte.ie/radio/mooneygoeswild/fp2007/january17.html
http://www.rte.ie/arts/2006/1129/theeleventhhour.html

External links 
 Official homepage

Year of birth missing (living people)
Living people
Irish guitarists
Irish male guitarists
Irish classical guitarists